The 2002 WNBA season was the fourth for the Minnesota Lynx. The Lynx failed to emerge from their recent struggles, going dead last in the West.

Offseason

WNBA Draft

Regular season

Season standings

Season schedule

Player stats

References

Minnesota Lynx seasons
Minnesota
Minnesota Lynx